In geometry, a locus (plural: loci) (Latin word for "place", "location") is a set of all points (commonly, a line, a line segment, a curve or a surface), whose location satisfies or is determined by one or more specified conditions.

The set of the points that satisfy some property is often called the locus of a point satisfying this property. The use of the singular in this formulation is a witness that, until the end of the 19th century, mathematicians did not consider infinite sets. Instead of viewing lines and curves as sets of points, they viewed them as places where a point may be located or may move.

History and philosophy
Until the beginning of the 20th century, a geometrical shape (for example a curve) was not considered as an infinite set of points; rather, it was considered as an entity on which a point may be located or on which it moves. Thus a circle in the Euclidean plane was defined as the locus of a point that is at a given distance of a fixed point, the center of the circle. In modern mathematics, similar concepts are more frequently reformulated by describing shapes as sets; for instance, one says that the circle is the set of points that are at a given distance from the center.

In contrast to the set-theoretic view, the old formulation avoids considering infinite collections, as avoiding the actual infinite was an important philosophical position of earlier mathematicians.

Once set theory became the universal basis over which the whole mathematics is built, the term of locus became rather old-fashioned. Nevertheless, the word is still widely used, mainly for a concise formulation, for example:
 Critical locus, the set of the critical points of a differentiable function.
 Zero locus or vanishing locus, the set of points where a function vanishes, in that it takes the value zero.
 Singular locus, the set of the singular points of an algebraic variety.
 Connectedness locus, the subset of the parameter set of a family of rational functions for which the Julia set of the function is connected.

More recently, techniques such as the theory of schemes, and the use of category theory instead of set theory to give a foundation to mathematics, have returned to notions more like the original definition of a locus as an object in itself rather than as a set of points.

Examples in plane geometry
Examples from plane geometry include:
 The set of points equidistant from two points is a perpendicular bisector to the line segment connecting the two points.
 The set of points equidistant from two lines that cross is the angle bisector.
 All conic sections are loci:
 Circle: the set of points for which the distance from a single point is constant (the radius).
 Parabola: the set of points equidistant from a fixed point (the focus) and a line (the directrix).
 Hyperbola: the set of points for each of which the absolute value of the difference between the distances to two given foci is a constant.
 Ellipse: the set of points for each of which the sum of the distances to two given foci is a constant

Other examples of loci appear in various areas of mathematics. For example, in complex dynamics, the Mandelbrot set is a subset of the complex plane that may be characterized as the connectedness locus of a family of polynomial maps.

Proof of a locus
To prove a geometric shape is the correct locus for a given set of conditions, 
one generally divides the proof into two stages: the proof that all the points that satisfy the conditions are on the given shape, and the proof that all the points on the given shape satisfy the conditions.

Examples

First example
Find the locus of a point P that has a given ratio of distances k = d1/d2 to two given points.

In this example k = 3, A(−1, 0) and B(0, 2) are chosen as the fixed points.

 P(x, y) is a point of the locus
 
 
 
 
 

This equation represents a circle with center (1/8, 9/4) and radius . It is the circle of Apollonius defined by these values of k, A, and B.

Second example

A triangle ABC has a fixed side [AB] with length c. 
Determine the locus of the third vertex C such that
the medians from A and C are orthogonal.

Choose an orthonormal coordinate system such that A(−c/2, 0), B(c/2, 0). 
C(x, y) is the variable third vertex. The center of [BC] is M((2x + c)/4, y/2). The median from C has a slope  y/x. The median AM has slope  2y/(2x + 3c).

C(x, y) is a point of the locus
 the medians from A and C are orthogonal
  
  
  

The locus of the vertex C is a circle with center (−3c/4, 0) and radius 3c/4.

Third example

A locus can also be defined by two associated curves depending on one common parameter. If the parameter varies, the intersection points of the associated curves describe the locus.

In the figure, the points K and L are fixed points on a given line m. The line k is a variable line through K. The line l through L is perpendicular to k. The angle  between k and m is the parameter.
k and  l are  associated lines depending on the common parameter. The variable intersection point S of k and l describes a circle. This circle is the locus of the intersection point of the two associated lines.

Fourth example

A locus of points need not be one-dimensional (as a circle, line, etc.). For example, the locus of the inequality  is the portion of the plane that is below the line of equation .

See also
Algebraic variety
Curve
Line (geometry)
Set-builder notation
Shape (geometry)

References

Elementary geometry